Andriy Askoldovich Hrivko (also transliterated Hryvko or Grivko, born 7 August 1983) is a Ukrainian former racing cyclist, who rode professionally between 2005 and 2018. Since retiring from racing, Hrivko currently serves as the president of the Ukrainian Cycling Federation.

Career
Born in Zuya, Bilohirsk Raion, Hrivko competed at the 2008 Beijing Olympics in the road race, in which he did not finish, and the individual time trial, where he finished 31st. At the 2012 Summer Olympics, he only competed in the road race, finishing in 17th place.

He also competed in the 2015 European Games for Ukraine in cycling. He earned a silver medal in men's road race.

He competed for Ukraine in the 2016 Summer Olympics.

In 2017 Hrivko was removed from the Tour of Dubai for punching Marcel Kittel in the head during the third stage of that race, prompting a query into whether or not he should be suspended and sanctioned by the UCI.

After retiring from the professional peloton, Hrivko became the president of the Ukrainian Cycling Federation.

Major results

2003
 8th Trofeo Internazionale Bastianelli
2004
 1st Overall Giro delle Regioni
 8th Time trial, UCI Under-23 Road World Championships
2005
 1st  Time trial, National Road Championships
 2nd Firenze–Pistoia
 6th Rund um die Nürnberger Altstadt
2006
 1st  Time trial, National Road Championships
 3rd Overall Critérium International
 3rd GP Miguel Induráin
 9th Time trial, UCI Road World Championships
2007
 3rd Eindhoven Team Time Trial
 9th Firenze–Pistoia
2008
 1st  Time trial, National Road Championships
 1st Firenze–Pistoia
 2nd Intaka Tech Worlds View Challenge 1
 2nd Intaka Tech Worlds View Challenge 2
 5th Road race, UCI Road World Championships
 9th Chrono des Nations
2009
 1st  Time trial, National Road Championships
 1st Stage 1b (TTT) Settimana Internazionale di Coppi e Bartali
 2nd Overall Course de la Solidarité Olympique
 3rd Gran Premio Nobili Rubinetterie
 4th Overall Tour de San Luis
 8th Chrono des Nations
2010
 2nd Overall Three Days of De Panne
2011
 6th Overall Three Days of De Panne
 8th Overall Tour of Beijing
2012
 National Road Championships
1st  Road race
1st  Time trial
 5th Overall Tour of Belgium
2013
 1st Stage 1 (TTT) Vuelta a España
 2nd Time trial, National Road Championships
 3rd Overall Eneco Tour
 5th Road race, UCI Road World Championships
2014
 4th Overall Eneco Tour
2015
 European Games
2nd  Road race
4th Time trial
 6th Overall Eneco Tour
 10th Overall Tour of Qatar
2016
 1st  Overall La Méditerranéenne
1st Stage 3
2017
 10th Overall Arctic Race of Norway
2018
 1st  Time trial, National Road Championships
 4th Overall Danmark Rundt
 5th Overall Tour of Belgium
 10th Overall Tour du Haut Var

Grand Tour general classification results timeline

References

External links

 
 
 
 
 
 
 

1983 births
Living people
People from Bilohirsk Raion
Ukrainian male cyclists
Cyclists at the 2008 Summer Olympics
Cyclists at the 2012 Summer Olympics
Cyclists at the 2016 Summer Olympics
Olympic cyclists of Ukraine
European Games medalists in cycling
European Games silver medalists for Ukraine
Cyclists at the 2015 European Games